Charmaine Sheh Sze-man (born 28 May 1975) is a Hong Kong actress. After winning second runner-up in the 1997 Miss Hong Kong pageant, Sheh signed a contract with TVB in 1998. She is best known for her roles in Return of the Cuckoo (2000), War and Beauty (2004), Maidens' Vow (2006), Forensic Heroes II (2008), Beyond the Realm of Conscience (2009), Can't Buy Me Love (2010), When Heaven Burns (2011), Line Walker (2014), and Story of Yanxi Palace (2018).

Career
Sheh graduated in 1994 from the International Hotel Management Institute Switzerland in Lucerne, Switzerland, with a diploma in hotel management. In October 1997, she signed with Hong Kong television network TVB after emerging as second runner-up in the 1997 Miss Hong Kong Pageant. The early stage of her career was often characterised by her coy, squeaky voice and criticisms of her acting skills. However, Sheh overcame these problems and made her breakthrough in Return of the Cuckoo in 2000, co-starring with Nancy Sit, Julian Cheung and Steven Ma.

In 2006, Sheh became the first TVB actress to win two major awards at the same TVB Anniversary Awards ceremony, clinching the Best Actress Award and My Favourite Female TV Character for her performance in Maidens' Vow.

Sheh also won the Top Four Actresses Award with Ruby Lin, Zhao Wei and Liu Yifei. Sheh was the first Hong Kong television actress to be shortlisted for the semi-finals of the Best Actress category at the 35th International Emmy Awards in 2007. In 2011 she was awarded Best Actress at the Asian Television Awards for her performance in Can't Buy Me Love.

After 14 years, Sheh left TVB to develop her acting career in China and returned in 2014 for a two-year contract with TVBC, a joint venture between TVB and China Media Capital (CMC) and Shanghai Media Group (SMG).

Sheh returned to the small screen in 2014, playing the undercover cop Ting Siu Ka (丁小嘉) in Line Walker, earning critical acclaim. Her on-screen partnership with Raymond Lam was also favoured by viewers. She received eleven awards with her role in Line Walker, including Best Actress and Favourite TV Character at TVB 48th Anniversary Awards, TVB Star Awards Malaysia 2014 and Singapore StarHub TVB Awards 2014, which broke the record of receiving the most awards with a single role in TVB.

Sheh is the third actress to win Best Actress twice (tied with Liza Wang and Sheren Tang) and her third time to win "My Favourite Female Character" at the TVB Anniversary Awards.

In 2018, Sheh was highly praise for her profound portrayal of Hoifa-Nara Shushen (嫻妃) in the Chinese period drama Story of Yanxi Palace. For this role, she was nominated for Best Supporting Actress at the 24th Huading Awards and garnered international fame.

She gained some controversy in 2019 when she was seen liking a post on Instagram related to the support of the 2019 Hong Kong protests. This garnered extreme backlash from Chinese citizens calling for her to be banned from the Chinese entertainment industry but she was quick to retract the like and publicly stated that she did not know the context of the photo thinking it was just a nice photograph taken by a known photographer and was extremely shocked when she found out. The statement in turn angered some Hong Kong citizens.

In 2020, Sheh starred in Winter Begonia as the wife of Cheng Fengtai. Sheh portrays Xiao Hunian in the 2020 drama series The Legend of Xiao Chuo.

Filmography

Television series

Film

Variety and game show

Music video

Discography

Awards

References

十月初五的月光 / 澳門街 ratings – Sina.com
Television Broadcast Limited Corporate Review Report 2000
2006 TVB Anniversary Awards – Sina.com 12 Nov 2006
2006 TVB Anniversary Awards – Sina.com 12 Nov 2006
2007 International Emmy Awards – Ent.Tom 28 Aug 2007
2007 International Emmy Nominees – Xinhuanet 28 Aug 2007
TVB drama 東山飄雨西關晴 taken from China's New Express Daily 16 Dec 2007

External links

Charmaine Sheh on Sina Twitter

1975 births
Living people
Cantopop singer-songwriters
21st-century Hong Kong women singers
Hong Kong film actresses
Hong Kong women singer-songwriters
TVB veteran actors
Hong Kong television actresses
20th-century Hong Kong actresses
21st-century Hong Kong actresses